There are two operating offshore wind farms in the United States, and several more are in permitting or under construction. The Bureau of Ocean Energy Management studies potential sites in federal waters for offshore wind energy development and leases sites to developers, who work with state regulatory agencies to interconnect and market their electricity.

Operational utility scale

Proposed wind farms

Atlantic Coast 

There is more than 16 GW of capacity planned for the Atlantic Coast.  The map at right shows leases executed by the Bureau of Ocean Energy Management for the outer continental shelf off the Massachusetts and Rhode Island coasts, the first offshore wind energy area to be opened for auction, in 2014 (lease assignments as of 2022).  

Because of its shallow waters and average offshore wind speeds in excess of 9 m/s, the coast off Massachusetts has the greatest potential offshore wind production in the US, at more than 1 million GWh per year, followed by that of the Gulf Coast states. In 2016, an update to Massachusetts energy law committed the state to purchasing 1,600 MW of offshore wind by 2027, of which the first half was later awarded to Vineyard Wind (see project list below). The shallow waters off the New England coast and proximity to load centers such as Boston, Providence, and Long Island make this area the most economical for both construction of wind farms and delivery of power to favorable nodes on the electric grid.

The state of New Jersey is aiming for 7,500 MW of offshore wind power capacity by 2035 and 11,000 MW by 2040. New York has set of target of 2,400 megawatts (MW) of offshore wind by 2030. In February 2022, an auction for 6 lease areas in the New York Bight ended at $4.37 billion, with one area going for over one billion dollars. The combined areas could yield more than 5.6 gigawatts for an annual energy production of 19.6 TWh.

Virginia targets 5,400 MW by 2034.

List
The following table lists offshore wind farm areas (by nameplate capacity) that are in various states development for the Outer Continental Shelf in U.S. territorial waters of the East Coast of the United States, where a Bureau of Ocean Energy Management (BOEM) wind energy area lease has been secured and have gained at least some required regulatory approval before construction can begin. Distances are approximated and generally represent closest point of turbine array to shoreline, while acreage represents size of total lease area, which may be shared, and not the blocks within them allocated for the wind farm.

Great Lakes

Pacific and Gulf of Mexico coasts 
In October 2021, the Biden administration approved the initiation of mapping out potential lease areas along the Pacific and Gulf of Mexico coasts. In March 2022, five areas off the coast of California were defined for lease. An auction in December 2022 leased the areas for a total of $757 million.

Abandoned, postponed or decommissioned
Cape Wind (Massachusetts)
 Delaware Offshore Wind Farm
Fisherman's Energy Atlantic City Windfarm (New Jersey) Groundbreaking for the onshore portion of the project took place in December 2014. It was postponed in July 2017.

See also

Anbaric Development Partners
Atlantic Wind Connection
Wind power in the United States
List of wind farms
List of offshore wind farms
Lists of offshore wind farms by country
Wind Power
NIMBY
Energy Policy Act of 2005

Notes

External links
 List of U.S. offshore wind projects
 'Only a matter of time': U.S. offshore wind struggles to get off the ground
 Draft Environmental Impact Statement - produced by the US Army Corps of Engineers
 Opinion piece on wind turbines shifting
 Cape Wind Project Page - company website
 Clean Power Now - a pro-project advocacy group
 Alliance to Protect Nantucket Sound - anti-project advocacy group
 Northeast Ocean Data: Offshore Wind Projects

United States
Wind farms offshore
Proposed wind farms in the United States
Offshore wind farms in the United States